The 2018–19 season was the 94th season of competitive football in Poland.

League competitions

Ekstraklasa

Regular season

Championship round

Relegation round

I liga

Regular season

Polish Cup

Polish SuperCup

Polish clubs in Europe

Legia Warsaw

2018–19 UEFA Champions League

Qualifying phase

2018–19 UEFA Europa League

Qualifying phase

Jagiellonia Białystok
2018–19 UEFA Europa League

Qualifying phase

Lech Poznań
2018–19 UEFA Europa League

Qualifying phase

Górnik Zabrze
2018–19 UEFA Europa League

Qualifying phase

National teams

Poland national team

2018–19 UEFA Nations League

Friendlies

UEFA Euro 2020 qualifying

Poland national under-21 team

2019 UEFA European Under-21 Championship qualification

Friendlies

2019 UEFA European Under-21 Championship

Notes

References